Barkesh or Barkash may refer to:
 Barkesh, East Azerbaijan
 Barkesh, Hamadan